This is a list of notable think tanks in the United States.

Politics and economy 

Acton Institute
Allegheny Institute for Public Policy
American Action Forum
American Civil Rights Union
American College of Pediatricians
American Enterprise Institute
American Institute for Economic Research
Atlas Network
Ayn Rand Institute
Beacon Center of Tennessee
Beacon Hill Institute
Berggruen Institute
Bipartisan Policy Center
Brookings Institution
Buckeye Institute
Caesar Rodney Institute
Carnegie Endowment for International Peace
Cascade Policy Institute
Cato Institute
Center for a Just Society
Center for American Progress
Center for Automotive Research
Center for Development and Strategy
Center for Economic and Policy Research
Center for Freedom and Prosperity
Center for Governmental Research
Center for Immigration Studies
Center for Media and Democracy
Center for National Policy
Center for Public Integrity
Center for Public Justice
Center for Strategic and Budgetary Assessments
Center on Budget and Policy Priorities
Claremont Institute
Committee for a Responsible Federal Budget
Committee for Economic Development
Competitive Enterprise Institute
Concord Coalition
Constitution Project
Council on Competitiveness
Demos
Drum Major Institute
Economic Opportunity Institute
Economic Policy Institute
Employment Policies Institute
Eno Center for Transportation
Every Texan
Federation for American Immigration Reform
Florida Institute for Sustainable Energy
Foundation for Economic Education
Future of American Democracy Foundation
Goldwater Institute
Group of Thirty
Guttmacher Institute
Hispanic American Center for Economic Research
Hoover Institution
Hudson Institute
Independence Institute
Institute for New Economic Thinking
Institute for Policy Studies
Institute for Women's Policy Research
Institute on Religion and Democracy
Institute on Taxation and Economic Policy
International Food Policy Research Institute
James A. Baker III Institute for Public Policy
James Madison Institute
John S. Watson Institute for Public Policy
Joint Center for Political and Economic Studies
Kansas Policy Institute
Levy Economics Institute
Lexington Institute
Lincoln Institute of Land Policy
Lugar Center
Mackinac Center for Public Policy
Manhattan Institute for Policy Research
MassINC
McCain Institute
Mercatus Center at George Mason University
Migration Policy Institute
Milken Institute
Mises Institute
National Association of Scholars
National Bureau of Asian Research
National Bureau of Economic Research
National Center for Policy Analysis
National Endowment for Democracy
National Policy Institute
New America
New Democrat Network
Niskanen Center
Oklahoma Policy Institute
Oregon Center for Public Policy
Pacific Research Institute
Pembroke Center for Teaching and Research on Women at Brown University
People's Policy Project
Peterson Institute for International Economics
Pew Research Center
Philadelphia Society
Pioneer Institute
Policy Matters Ohio
Population Research Institute (PRI)
Potomac Institute for Policy Studies
Progressive Policy Institute
Prosperity Now
Public Citizen
Public Policy Institute of California
R Street Institute
RAND Corporation
Reason Foundation
Ripon Society
RMI
Rockefeller Institute of Government
Rockford Institute
Rockridge Institute
Roosevelt Institute
Seven Pillars Institute
Show-Me Institute
Social Science Research Council
SRI International
Tax Foundation
Texas Public Policy Foundation
The Century Foundation
The Conference Board
The Gravel Institute
The Harkin Institute for Public Policy & Citizen Engagement
The Heartland Institute
The Heritage Foundation
The Independent Institute
The Reform Institute
Third Way
Thomas B. Fordham Institute
Urban Institute
W. E. Upjohn Institute for Employment Research
Washington Policy Center
World Sindhi Institute

International relations and security 

38 North
American Foreign Policy Council
American Israel Public Affairs Committee
American Security Council Foundation
American–Iranian Council
Arctic Institute
Asia Society
Aspen Institute
Atlantic Council
Belfer Center for Science and International Affairs
Carnegie Council for Ethics in International Affairs
Carnegie Endowment for International Peace
Center for a New American Security
Center for Advanced Defense Studies
Center for Global Development
Center for International Development
Center for International Policy
Center for International Security and Cooperation
Center for Naval Analysis
Center for Security Policy
Center for Strategic and International Studies
Center for the National Interest (The Nixon Center)
Center for Transatlantic Relations
Center on Global Interests
Chicago Council on Global Affairs
Committee on the Present Danger
Council on Foreign Relations
Council on Hemispheric Affairs
EastWest Institute
Foreign Policy Initiative
Foreign Policy Research Institute
Foundation for Defense of Democracies
Gatestone Institute
German Marshall Fund of the United States
Global Trade Watch
GlobalSecurity.org
Henry L. Stimson Center
India, China & America Institute
Institute for Defense Analyses
Institute for Science and International Security
Inter-American Dialogue
International Crisis Group
Islands Society
Israel Policy Forum
J Street
Jamestown Foundation
Jewish Institute for National Security Affairs
Middle East Forum
Middle East Institute
National Security Network
Open Society Foundations
Pacific Council on International Policy
Pacific Forum CSIS
Peterson Institute for International Economics
Project 2049 Institute
Project for the New American Century
RTI International
Sikh Coalition
South Asian Center for Reintegration and Independent Research
Strategic Studies Institute
Streit Council for a Union of Democracies
Tellus Institute
The Stimson Center
United States Institute of Peace
Washington Institute for Near East Policy
Woodrow Wilson International Center for Scholars
World Affairs Council
World Resources Institute

Environment, science and technology 

Battelle Memorial Institute
Center for Climate and Energy Solutions
Center for Ethical Solutions
Copenhagen Consensus Center
Discovery Institute
Earth Institute
Fusion Energy Foundation
General Electric EdgeLab
Global Development and Environment Institute
GTRI Office of Policy Analysis and Research
Hastings Center
Information Technology and Innovation Foundation
Keck Institute for Space Studies
Metropolitan Area Planning Council
New England Complex Systems Institute (NECSI)
Noblis
Pacific Institute
Property and Environment Research Center (PERC)
Resources for the Future
RTI International (Research Triangle Institute)
Santa Fe Institute
Scripps Research Institute
Watson Institute at Brown University

Arts and humanities 

Americans for the Arts
Catholic Family and Human Rights Institute
Center for Excellence in Higher Education
Center for Muslim-Jewish Engagement
Foundation for Excellence in Education
Foundation for Rational Economics and Education
International Center for Research on Women
International Intellectual Property Institute
New Teacher Center
Urban Land Institute
WestEd

See also

List of think tanks
Social sciences

References

Think tanks
United States